is a Japanese actor and model who is affiliated with Ohta Production.

On 2013, Kunishima was the winner of the 26th Junon Super Boy Contest Grand Prix. He made his acting debut in 2014 where he starred in the movie The Werewolf Game: The Beast Side as Yuki Yanagawa. On 2016, Kunishima made his major drama debut in 2016 Super Sentai series Doubutsu Sentai Zyuohger as Misao Mondo/Zyuoh The World.

Filmography

TV series

Film

Video game

References

External links
  
 

1994 births
Living people
Male actors from Gifu Prefecture
Models from Gifu Prefecture